Note 2 may refer to several smartphones:

 Meizu M2 Note
 Samsung Galaxy Note II
 Xiaomi Mi Note 2
 Xiaomi Redmi Note 2